Barriopsis iraniana is an endophytic fungus first found on Citrus, Mangifera and Olea species in Iran.

References

Further reading
Abdollahzadeh, Jafar, Rasoul Zare, and Alan JL Phillips. "Phylogeny and taxonomy of Botryosphaeria and Neofusicoccum species in Iran, with description of Botryosphaeria scharifii sp. nov." Mycologia 105.1 (2013): 210–220.
Trakunyingcharoen, T., et al. "Botryosphaeriaceae associated with diseases of mango (Mangifera indica)." Australasian Plant Pathology 43.4 (2014): 425–438.

External links
MycoBank

Botryosphaeriales